Leslie Alphonso "Les" Laing (19 February 1925 – 7 February 2021) was a Jamaican athlete and a winner of gold medal in 4 × 400 m relay at the 1952 Summer Olympics.

Biography
Born in Linstead, Jamaica, Laing previously competed in the 1948 Summer Olympics, where he finished sixth in 200 m and was eliminated in the heats of 100 m. He probably missed a medal when Arthur Wint pulled a muscle in the 4 × 400 m relay final. At the Helsinki Olympics, Laing was fifth in the 200 m and ran the second leg in the Jamaican 4 × 400 m relay team, which won the gold medal with a new world record of 3:03.9. In 2005 he was inducted into the Central American and Caribbean Confederation Hall of Fame.

He died twelve days short of his 96th birthday.

Competition record

References

External links 
 
 

1925 births
2021 deaths
People from Saint Catherine Parish
Jamaican male sprinters
Athletes (track and field) at the 1948 Summer Olympics
Athletes (track and field) at the 1952 Summer Olympics
Olympic athletes of Jamaica
Olympic gold medalists for Jamaica
Athletes (track and field) at the 1954 British Empire and Commonwealth Games
Commonwealth Games competitors for Jamaica
Medalists at the 1952 Summer Olympics
Olympic gold medalists in athletics (track and field)
Central American and Caribbean Games gold medalists for Jamaica
Competitors at the 1954 Central American and Caribbean Games
Central American and Caribbean Games medalists in athletics
20th-century Jamaican people
21st-century Jamaican people